Christina Bendt Petersen  (born 17 September 1974) is a Danish retired football midfielder. She was part of the Denmark women's national football team and competed at the 1996 Summer Olympics, playing three matches.  She played 352 matches for Fortuna Hjørring.

See also
 Denmark at the 1996 Summer Olympics

References

External links
 
 
 

1974 births
Living people
Danish women's footballers
Place of birth missing (living people)
Footballers at the 1996 Summer Olympics
Olympic footballers of Denmark
Women's association football midfielders
1995 FIFA Women's World Cup players
Denmark women's international footballers
1999 FIFA Women's World Cup players